Bruh is an American comedy television series created, written, executive produced and directed by Tyler Perry that premiered on May 7, 2020 on BET+. It is set in the same universe as Tyler Perry's Sistas, with the special appearance of KJ Smith as Andrea "Andi" Barnes. It stars Barry Brewer and Chandra Currelley. 

In September 2020, a second season was announced consisting of 19 episodes. The second season premiered on May 27, 2021. In November 2021, the series was renewed for a third season and it was announced that filming for the season ended The third season premiered on May 12, 2022.

Plot
The series follows five middle-aged best friends John, Tom, Mike, Bill and Greg from college as they explore the world of dating, careers and friendship in a present-day society. John, the owner of a sandwich shop (A's & J's), struggles to make ends meet after an incident got him kicked out of college. He relies on his friends for everything and lives with his mother, Alice who constantly tolerates him. She co-owns the business with her son. Tom, a successful doctor, struggles to uphold his name when an incident from his past with one of his co-workers puts his career in jeopardy. Mike, who works as a lawyer, wants to settle down but struggles to put his womanizing ways to rest. His on-and-off girlfriend Pamela finds it hard to believe. Bill, who is an architect, is revisited by his ex, Regina who is recently engaged to one of his good friends from college so his mission is to win back her heart, due to infidelity which ended their relationship. Bill works hard to prove to her that he's a changed man and Greg, Tom's college roommate who is also a doctor, moves to Atlanta to rebuild his life after going through a rough divorce and immediately builds a relationship with the guys while Tom is away dealing with a family emergency and works with Tom at the hospital. Greg meets Darla, an officer who lives down the hall from him and Tom and is instantly attracted to her. The five men come together to get away from their everyday lives.

Cast and characters

Main
Barry Brewer as Johnathan "John" Watts, a businessman
Mahdi Cocci as Dr. Thomas "Tom" Brooks, a doctor
Phillip Mullings Jr. as Michael "Mike" Alexander, a lawyer
Monti Washington as Billiam "Bill" Frazier, an architect
Chandra Currelley-Young as Alice Watts, John's mother 
Candice Renee as Regina, Bill's ex, who is engaged to another man
Alyssa Goss as Pamela, Mike's on-and-off girlfriend
Shawn Vaughn as Dr. Greg Hunter (season 3; recurring season 2), Tom's college roommate who moves to Atlanta after getting divorced

Recurring
Angela Marie Rigsby as Laura (season 1), John and Alice's employee at their restaurant
Caroline Harris as Valerie (season 1), a nurse who works with Tom at the hospital who sets out to destroy Tom's career by accusing him of sexual harassment
Darren Sirell Cain as Peter Promnickel (season 1), Regina's ex-fiance
Quei Tann as Officer Darla Grills (season 2–present), Tom's neighbor and Greg's love interest
Liz Lafontant as Natalie (season 2–present), Bill's ex and a yoga instructor
Ebony N. Mayo as Littia (season 2–present), a bartender and John's new love interest 
Karen Malina White as Hilda (season 3), Regina's mother

Special guest cast from Tyler Perry's Sistas
KJ Smith as Andrea "Andi" Barnes, Mike's friend and colleague
Michael King as Don Bellamy, Mike and Andi's boss

Episodes

Series overview

Season 1 (2020)

Season 2 (2021)

Season 3 (2022)

References

External links

2020 American television series debuts
2020s American black television series
2020s American comedy television series
BET+ original programming
English-language television shows
Television series by Tyler Perry Studios
Television series created by Tyler Perry